1S or 1s may refer to:

 1s electron, in an atomic orbital
 Sabre (computer system)'s IATA code
 1S, a series of Toyota S engines
 SSH 1S (WA); see Washington State Route 502, Washington State Route 503

See also
Shilling
Second
 Ones (disambiguation)
S1 (disambiguation)